The divided flower moth (Schinia scissoides) is a moth of the family Noctuidae. It is found in North America, including North Carolina, South Carolina and Florida.

The wingspan is about 22 mm.

External links
Images
Moths of South Carolina
Species report

Schinia
Moths of North America
Moths described in 1936